Dubail Union is a union of Delduar Upazila, Tangail District, Bangladesh. It is situated at 15 km southeast of Tangail.

Demographics

According to Population Census 2011 performed by Bangladesh Bureau of Statistics, The total population of Dubail union is 24,639. There are 5,688 households in total.

Education

The literacy rate of Dubail Union is 54.4% (Male-56.7%, Female-52.4%).

See also
 Union Councils of Tangail District

References

Populated places in Dhaka Division
Populated places in Tangail District
Unions of Delduar Upazila